Komi cuisine consists of the cuisine of Komi Republic in the north-east of European Russia and the Komi people, and is characterized by the rich use of local foods.

Significant differences separate Komis' dining tendencies in the northern and southern regions of their homeland. In the northern reindeer-herding and hunting areas, meat is eaten daily, but not in the more agricultural south. In the south, fish hold an important place on tables; hogs and poultry are kept less often.

Komi women are fond of baking fish pie "черинянь" on festive family occasions. The highly popular "Fish Pie Festival" (Черинянь гаж) is held annually on the last Sunday of June in the village of Byzovaya, Pechora Raion.

Komi Republic
Russian cuisine